Tatyana Khashimovna Nikitina (born 31 December 1945) is a prominent Russian bard. She usually performs together with her husband, Sergey Nikitin.

Biography
She was born Tatiana Sadykova in Dushanbe (currently Tajikistan) on December 31, 1945. In 1971, she graduated from the Department of Physics of Moscow State University. In 1968, she began singing in a quintet led by her husband, Sergey Nikitin. They worked together as biophysicists (both have Ph.D.s in Physics) as well as singers, creating many popular songs. Together they recorded more than 15 CDs and Vinyls (see works).

In 1990, she abandoned her research work to become the Manager for Culture of the October District  ispolkom of Moscow, then became Deputy Prefect of the Central District of Moscow, and in 1992–1995 she was a deputy to the Minister for Culture of Russia.  From 1998 to 2012, she worked as a manager at Kartina, an Italo-Swiss firm that organized art exhibitions.

References

External links
Biography of Tatiana and Sergey Nikitins
Biography of Tatiana Nikitina

1945 births
Living people
People from Dushanbe
Moscow State University alumni
Russian bards
20th-century Russian women politicians
Soviet physicists
Soviet women singers
Soviet women singer-songwriters
Soviet singer-songwriters
20th-century Russian women singers
20th-century Russian singers